Mikhail Mikhaylovich Borodkin (1852 – 1919) was Russian Empire lieutenant general, military lawyer, senator, state councilman, and historian. He is best remembered as the author of a seminal six volume history of Finland, published from 1908 to 1915.

Biography 
Mikhail Mikhailovich Borodkin was born in Bomarsund in 1852. Borodkin was a graduate of Alexander Military Law Academy. Assistant to the chief military prosecutor, 1909; appointed head of the Alexander Military Law Academy, 1911; Senator, 1911. Member of the State Council, 1916.

Borodkin wrote extensively on the Finnish question. He published an extensive and detailed six-volume Istoriia Finliandii (History of Finland), published  from 1908 to 1915.

Works 
 Istoriia Finliandii (History of Finland). In six volumes. 1908–1915.
 Peter the Great times.
 Elizabeth Petrovna Times 
 Times of Catherine II and Paul I.
 Time of Emperor Nicholas I 
 The Recent History of Finland. Management Time of N. I. Bobrikov 
 Volume 6. Time of Emperor Alexander II 
 Finland: Its Place in the Russian State. 1911.

Further reading 
 V.I. Gurko. Features And Figures Of The Past. Government And Opinion In The Reign Of Nicholas II.
 The Modern Encyclopedia of Russian and Soviet History. Vol. 5.

References

1852 births
1919 deaths
People from Sund, Åland
People from Turku and Pori Province (Grand Duchy of Finland)
Imperial Russian Army generals
Historians from the Russian Empire
Historians of Finland
Members of the State Council (Russian Empire)
Members of the Russian Assembly